Sartor respectus is a species of headstander endemic to Brazil. 
It is found in the upper Xingu River basin, Brazil.

References

Géry, J., 1977. Characoids of the world. Neptune City ; Reigate : T.F.H. [etc.]; 672 p. 

Anostomidae
Fish of Brazil
Endemic fauna of Brazil
Taxa named by George S. Myers
Taxa named by Antenor Leitão de Carvalho
Fish described in 1959